is a JR East railway station located in the city of Kazuno, Akita Prefecture, Japan.

Lines
Towada-Minami Station is served by the Hanawa Line, and is located 77.7 rail kilometers from the terminus of the line at Kōma Station.

Station layout
Towada-Minami Station is reversal station with a single island platform serving traffic on a switchback, connected to the station building by a level crossing. The station has a Midori no Madoguchi staffed ticket office.

Platforms

History
The line was nationalized on June 1, 1934, becoming part of the Japanese Government Railways (JGR) system. The JGR became the Japan National Railways (JNR) after World War II. The station was renamed to its present name on June 1, 1957. The station was absorbed into the JR East network upon the privatization of the JNR on April 1, 1987.

Passenger statistics
In fiscal 2018, the station was used by an average of 162 passengers daily (boarding passengers only).

Surrounding area
 
 
Tohoku Expressway – Towada Interchange

See also
 List of Railway Stations in Japan

References

External links

  

Kazuno, Akita
Hanawa Line
Railway stations in Japan opened in 1920
Railway stations in Akita Prefecture
Stations of East Japan Railway Company